Barry Charles Wilde  (3 September 1928 – 18 January 2018) was an Australian politician. He served as a Labor Party Member of the New South Wales Legislative Assembly from 1976 until 1988, representing the electorate of Parramatta.

Wilde previously served on Parramatta City Council from 1959 to 1977, as deputy mayor in 1966 and as mayor from 1967 to 1974. Having joined the Labor Party in 1949, he held various positions in the local branch. He ran for the seat of Parramatta in the 1966 and 1969 Federal elections against Sir Nigel Bowen, and the 1974 Federal election against Philip Ruddock; however, he was unsuccessful at each attempt.

Following the retirement of sitting State Member Dan Mahoney, Wilde was elected to the Labor seat of Parramatta at the 1976 state election. Wilde was re-elected at the 1978, 1981, and 1984 elections. This was despite an electoral redistribution in 1979, where the safe Labor seat became marginally Liberal. Wilde was subsequently defeated by Liberal candidate John Books in the 1988 election.

In 2016 he was awarded the Medal of the Order of Australia "for service to the Parliament of New South Wales, and to the community of Parramatta".

A bridge that crosses Parramatta River, running north from Smith Street to Wilde Avenue and constructed in 1975, is named in his honour.

References

 

1928 births
2018 deaths
Members of the New South Wales Legislative Assembly
Australian Labor Party members of the Parliament of New South Wales
Recipients of the Medal of the Order of Australia
Mayors and Lord Mayors of Parramatta
People from Marrickville